Senator Schuette may refer to:

Bill Schuette (born 1953), Michigan State Senate
John Schuette (1837–1919), Wisconsin State Senate